Sardaphaenops supramontanus is a species of beetle in the family Carabidae, the only species in the genus Sardaphaenops.

References

Trechinae